The 2008 Denbighshire County Council election took place in Denbighshire, Wales, on 1 May 2008 to elect members of Denbighshire Council. This was the same day as other 2008 United Kingdom local elections. The previous elections took place in 2004 and the next all-council elections took place in 2012.

Background
Six months before the election, the Independent council leader, Rhiannon Hughes, and her entire cabinet had been voted out of their positions, following the release of a critical schools report. 

Contests in May 2008 took place in all of the 30 electoral wards.

Results

Overview
The Conservatives became the largest group on the council after taking new seats, largely from Independent councillors.

|}

Ward results

Bodelwyddan (one seat)

Corwen (one seat)

Denbigh Central (one seat)

Denbigh Lower (two seats)

Denbigh Upper/Henllan (two seats)

Dyserth (one seat)

Peter Owen was previously elected as an Independent, in 2004.

Efenechtyd (one seat)

Llanarmon-Yn-Lal/Llandelga (one seat)

Llanbedr Dyffryn Clwyd (one seat)

Llandrillo (one seat)

Llandyrnog (one seat)

Llanfair Dyffryn Clwyd Gwyddelwern (one seat)

Llangollen (two seats)

Llanrhaeadr-yng-Nghinmeirch (one seat)

Prestatyn Central (two seats)

Prestatyn East (two seats)

Prestatyn Meliden (one seat)

Prestatyn North (three seats)

In 2008 the DAW councillors stood as Independents

Prestatyn South West (two seats)

Rhuddlan (two seats)

Rhyl East (two seats)

Councillor Hannam was previously elected as an Independent.

Rhyl South (two seats)

Rhyl South East (three seats)

Rhyl South West (two seats)

Rhyl West (two seats)

Mark Webster had been elected as a Labour councillor in 2004.

Ruthin (three seats)

St Asaph East (one seat)

St Asaph West (one seat)

Trefnant (one seat)

Tremeirchion (one seat)

(a) Election Centre/Andrew Teale source also compares the percentage vote of the lead candidate for each party in the ward

* = sitting councillor in this ward prior to election

References

Denbigh
2008